X-Speed United Continental Team is a Canadian UCI Continental road cycling team. The team registered with the UCI for the 2019 season.

Team roster

Major wins
2019
 Stage 1 Tour de Iskandar Johor, Ryan Roth
 Stage 3 GP Charlevoix, Dylan McKenna
 Teams classification Grand Prix Cycliste de Saguenay

References

External links

Cycling teams established in 2019
UCI Continental Teams (Asia)
UCI Continental Teams (America)
Cycling teams based in Hong Kong
Cycling teams based in Canada